Sentinel Building may refer to:

 Sentinel Building (Centralia), Illinois
 Sentinel Building (North Shore City), New Zealand
 Sentinel Building (San Francisco), California